Bitoma exarata is a species of cylindrical bark beetle in the family Zopheridae. It is found in Central America, North America, and South America.

References

Further reading

 

Zopheridae
Articles created by Qbugbot
Beetles described in 1863